Gabriela is a 2001 American romance film, starring Seidy Lopez in the title role alongside Jaime Gomez as her admirer Mike. The film has been cited as an inspiration behind the Premiere Weekend Club, which supports Latino film-making.

Plot 
Gabriela, engaged to be married to Patrick, feels more of a sense of duty than anticipation towards their planned wedding. On meeting her at the clinic where he works, Mike falls in love with Gabriela, and turns to his friend Douglas and his brother for advice. When he asks Gabriela to break off her engagement, she refuses and takes Patrick to Mexico to meet her family, leaving Mike trying to find a way to save his hopes of marrying her.

Cast 
 Seidy Lopez - Gabriela
 Jaime P. Gomez - Mike
 Zach Galligan - Patrick
 Troy Winbush - Douglas
 Lupe Ontiveros - Grandma Josie
 Stacy Haiduk - Ilona
 Evelina Fernandez - Sofia
 Frank Medrano - Manny
 Sal Lopez - Policeman
 Danny De La Paz - Policeman
 Steve Valentine - Steven
 Liz Torres - Julia
 Lamont Bentley - Nick
 Patrick Rowe - Gary
 Teddy Lane Jr. - Rex
 Colette O'Connell - Ryan
 Patrick M.J. Finerty - Adrian
 Yennifer Behrens - Jesica

Soundtrack 
The film's soundtrack was written by Craig Stuart Garfinkle and Leo Marchildon and released on Power Point Records. The track Gabriela Tribute is performed by Latin jazz musician Poncho Sanchez and his band.

Reception 
The film received mixed reviews. Marc Salov, writing for the Austin Chronicle, likened Gabriela to a "melodramatic telenovela" and gave it one star out of five. Robert Koehler of Variety agreed, declaring that the film has "hardly enough substance to carry a 30-minute TV episode". However, epinions awarded Gabriela four stars out of five, noting that it is "not the same old love story".

Similarly, Linda Pliagas of Latin Style wrote "'Gabriela' is amazing. Seidy Lopez and Jaime Gomez set the screen on fire." and NuVisions wrote "Gabriela is a classic Hollywood love story with cutting edge wit. It's the most relevant Indie film since 'Sex, Lies and Videotape.".

References

External links 
 Gabriela
 Reviews
 Gabriela
 Movie Review: Gabriela
 http://www.cdbaby.com/Artist/Cosimo

2001 films
American romance films
2000s American films